Feriha Tevfik Dağ (née Negüz; 1910 – 22 April 1991) was a Turkish beauty pageant contestant and actress. She is best known for being the first Miss Turkey (1929). She participated again in the pageant in 1932 and finished second after Keriman Halis.

Filmography

Sources

External links 
 

1910 births
Miss Turkey winners
Turkish film actresses
1991 deaths
20th-century Turkish actresses
Actresses from Istanbul